John C. Broderick (October 22, 1942 in San Francisco, California – June 17, 2001 in Santa Monica, California) was an American film director, producer, screenwriter and entertainer.

He is mostly known for the sword and sorcery film The Warrior and the Sorceress.

Biography 
John's entertainment career began as a high school student actor in South San Francisco and while at college worked as a member of the San Francisco Mime Troupe. He performed in the Troupe's award-winning production of A Minstrel Show (or Civil Rights in a Cracker Barrel) He attended film schools in Sweden and London, and returned to the US to ply his trade. Initially he directed underground films in New York City and then moved on to a producing, directing, acting and editing career in Hollywood.

He worked on a wide range of films, including The Exorcist (1973, supervising editor, for which he received an Oscar nomination), Six Pack Annie (1975, director), Down and Out in Beverly Hills (1986, production manager) and Monkey Trouble (1994, production manager and co-producer).

He met his wife, Eunice (Neecee), when he was in Brazil during the filming of Moon over Parador. They lived in Malibu, California.

Broderick died in Santa Monica, California, on June 17, 2001. He had kidney disease for several years.

Partial filmography

References

External links 
 

Film producers from California
Businesspeople from San Francisco
1942 births
2001 deaths
Film directors from San Francisco
Screenwriters from California
20th-century American screenwriters
20th-century American businesspeople